A separable partial differential equation is one that can be broken into a set of separate equations of lower dimensionality (fewer independent variables) by a method of separation of variables.  This generally relies upon the problem having some special form or symmetry.  In this way, the partial differential equation (PDE) can be solved by solving a set of simpler PDEs, or even ordinary differential equations (ODEs) if the problem can be broken down into one-dimensional equations. 

The most common form of separation of variables is simple separation of variables in which a solution is obtained by assuming a solution of the form given by a product of functions of each individual coordinate. There is a special form of separation of variables called -separation of variables which is accomplished by writing the solution as a particular fixed function of the coordinates multiplied by a product of functions of each individual coordinate.

(This should not be confused with the case of a separable ODE, which refers to a somewhat different class of problems that can be broken into a pair of integrals; see separation of variables.)

Example 

For example, consider the time-independent Schrödinger equation

for the function  (in dimensionless units, for simplicity).  (Equivalently, consider the inhomogeneous Helmholtz equation.)  If the function  in three dimensions is of the form

(More generally, the separable cases of the Schrödinger equation were enumerated by Eisenhart in 1948.)

References 

Differential equations